The 1944 Quebec general election was held on August 8, 1944 to elect members of the Legislative Assembly of the Province of Quebec, Canada.  The Union Nationale, led by former premier Maurice Duplessis, defeated the incumbent Quebec Liberal Party, led by Adélard Godbout.  This was the first Quebec provincial election in which women were allowed to vote, having been granted suffrage at the provincial level in 1940 and at the federal level in 1919.

This election marked Duplessis's comeback after having defeated Godbout in the 1936 election and having lost to him in the 1939 election. Unlike in the 1939 election, when the alcoholic Duplessis was clearly drunk at numerous campaign rallies, le chef had benefited from the time he had spent in an American sanatorium in 1942-43, where he had sobered up, and in the 1944 election, Duplessis refrained from drinking.

The biggest issue during this election was provincial autonomy. In order to appeal to nationalist voters, Duplessis attacked the incumbent premier, claiming that he was not taking a strong enough stand against Ottawa. He mainly criticized Godbout for agreeing to transfer unemployment insurance from the province to the federal government. He also criticized the Rowell-Sirois Commission for its stance on unemployment insurance and equalization payments.

Another reason Duplessis won the election was by appealing to anti-Semitic prejudices in Quebec by making the false claim in a violently anti-Semitic speech that the Dominion government together with the Godbout government had made a secret deal with the "International Zionist Brotherhood" to settle 100,000 Jewish refugees left homeless by the Holocaust in Quebec after the war in exchange for Jewish campaign contributions to both the federal and provincial Liberal parties. By contrast, Duplessis claimed that he was not taking any money from the Jews, and if he were elected Premier, he would stop this plan to bring Jewish refugees to Quebec. To further push on the message, the Union Nationale handed out campaign pamphlets warning about the alleged plan to bring 100,000 Jewish refugees to Quebec, which featured a cartoon of the standard stereotype of an evil-looking, hook-nosed Jew handing bags of money to Godbout while in the background a vast horde of dirty, disreputable-looking, hook-nosed Jewish refugees were ready to descend on la belle province. Through Duplessis's story about the plan to settle 100,000 Jewish refugees in Quebec was entirely false, his story was widely believed in Quebec, and ensured he won the election. Duplessis's biographer Conrad Black argued that Duplessis was in no way personally anti-Semitic, but because the majority of Quebecois were at the time, Duplessis had merely used antisemitism to win the 1944 election. Duplessis won another three elections in a row, for a total of five terms of office (four consecutive), before dying in office in 1959.

In this wartime election, Godbout's support for Canadian Prime Minister William Lyon Mackenzie King in the Conscription Crisis of 1944 may have contributed to his defeat.

The Bloc Populaire won four seats on an anti-conscription platform. The Co-operative Commonwealth Federation (predecessor of the New Democratic Party) won one seat. Party member David Côté was elected to the legislature, but in July 1945, he decided to sit as an independent.

Redistribution of ridings
An Act passed before the election increased the number of MLAs from 86 to 91 through the following changes:

Results

|-
! colspan=2 rowspan=2 | Political party
! rowspan=2 | Party leader
! colspan=4 | MPPs
! colspan=4 | Votes
|-
! Candidates
!1939
!1944
!±
!#
! ±
!%
! ± (pp)
|-

|style="text-align:left;"|Maurice Duplessis
|91
|15
|48
|33
|505,661
|285,259
|38.02
|1.11
|-

|style="text-align:left;"|Adélard Godbout
|90
|69
|37
|32
|523,316
|221,934
|39.35
|14.15
|-

|style="text-align:left;"|André Laurendeau
|80
|–
|4
|4
|191,564
|
|14.40
|
|-

|style="text-align:left;"|Romuald-Joseph Lamoureux
|24
|–
|1
|1
|33,986
|31,473
|2.56
|2.11
|-

|style="text-align:left;"| 
|12
|–
|–
|–
|16,542
|
|1.24
|
|-
| style="background-color:#FF5555;" |  
| style="text-align:left;" |Parti national
|style="text-align:left;" | 
|–
|1
|–
|1
| style="text-align:center;" colspan="4"|did not campaign
|-
| style="background-color:#D9B2FF;" |  
| style="text-align:left;" |Action libérale nationale
|style="text-align:left;"| 
| style="text-align:center;" colspan="8"|did not campaign
|-
|rowspan="10" |  
|style="text-align:left;" colspan="10"|Other candidates
|-
|style="text-align:left;" |
|style="text-align:left;"|–
|16
|1
|–
|1
|12,766
|6,485
|0.96
|0.03
|-
|style="text-align:left;" |
|style="text-align:left;"|–
|2
|–
|1
|1
|8,711
|
|0.65
|
|-
|style="text-align:left;" |
|style="text-align:left;"|–
|7
|–
|–
|–
|8,656
|7,868
|0.65
|0.51
|-
|style="text-align:left;" |
|style="text-align:left;"|–
|2
|–
|–
|–
|8,355
|7,945
|0.63
|0.56
|-
|style="text-align:left;" |
|style="text-align:left;"|–
|3
|–
|–
|–
|7,873
|7,714
|0.59
|0.56
|-
|style="text-align:left;" |
|style="text-align:left;"|–
|3
|–
|–
|–
|6,775
|6,306
|0.51
|0.43
|-
|style="text-align:left;" |
|style="text-align:left;"|–
|1
|–
|–
|–
|3,015
|
|0.23
|
|-
|style="text-align:left;" |
|style="text-align:left;"|–
|1
|–
|–
|–
|2,583
|
|0.19
|
|-
|style="text-align:left;" |
|style="text-align:left;"|–
|1
|–
|–
|–
|156
|
|0.01
|
|-
! colspan="3" style="text-align:left;" | Total
| 333
| 86
! " colspan="2"| 91
! " colspan="2"| 1,329,959
! " colspan="2"| 100%
|-
| colspan="7" style="text-align:left;" | Rejected ballots
| 15,552
| 8,218
| colspan="2"|
|-
| colspan="7" style="text-align:left;" | Voter turnout
| 1,345,511
| 774,880
| 71.98
| 5.02
|-
| colspan="7" style="text-align:left;" | Registered electors
| 1,869,396
| 1,128,265
| colspan="2"|
|-
| colspan="5" style="text-align:left;" | Candidates returned by acclamation
| –
| 1
| colspan="4"|
|}

References

See also
 List of Quebec premiers
 Politics of Quebec
 Timeline of Quebec history
 List of Quebec political parties
 22nd Legislative Assembly of Quebec

Quebec general election
Elections in Quebec
General election
Quebec general election